Acemi Cadı is a popular Turkish comedy TV series produced by Star TV. It is based in large part on the American TV series Sabrina, the Teenage Witch.

Plot
On her 16th birthday, Ayşegül finds out that she is part of a witch family. Not only does she learn that she and her aunts Selda and Melda are witches, their cat Duman is also revealed to be her uncle that has been punished to live as a cat and her father is communicating with her through a book.

Whilst living as a seemingly ordinary student, she now has to learn how to control her powers and deal with her school life that gets mixed up by the popular but envious girl Tuğçe. Together with her crazy friend "Ceren", her secret crush "Selim", her macho fan "Toygar", she's going through many adventures.

Selda can't decide ex-lover Ferit and Principal Dilaver.(Celal Kadri Kınoğlu played two different roles "Dilaver" and "Ferit). Then, Melda fall love Principal Dilaver. Principal Dilaver, Melda, Teacher Hulki, Basketball Coach started to work in the school.

Main cast
Merve Boluğur (Ayşegül)
Şenay Gürler (Selda)
Nergis Kumbasar (Melda)
Celal Kadri Kınoğlu (Principal Dilaver), (Damat Ferit)
Çağkan Çulha (Selim)
Dicle Alkan (Ceren)
Levent Sülün (Hulki Hoca)
Billur Yazgan (Tuğçe)
Tuğçe Taşkıran (Berna)
Gökdeniz Tüzün (Ebru)
Cenk Gürpınar (Cenk)
Haluk Levent Karataş (Murat)
Hazal Kaya (Pelin)

References

External links

Merve Boluğur fan club
 https://web.archive.org/web/20070120093632/http://www.mervebolugur.org/

Sabrina the Teenage Witch
Turkish comedy television series
Television series by D Productions
2005 Turkish television series debuts
2007 Turkish television series endings
2000s Turkish television series
Star TV (Turkey) original programming
Television shows set in Istanbul
Television series produced in Istanbul
Television series set in the 2010s
Turkish television series based on American television series